The BWF World Tour is a Grade 2 badminton tournament series, sanctioned by Badminton World Federation (BWF). It is a competition open to the top world ranked players in singles (men's and women's) and doubles (men's, women's and mixed). The competition was announced on 19 March 2017 and came into effect starting from 2018, replacing the BWF Super Series, which was held from 2007 to 2017.

The BWF World Tour are divided into six levels, namely World Tour Finals, Super 1000, Super 750, Super 500, and Super 300 in order (part of the HSBC World Tour). One other category of tournament, the BWF Tour Super 100 level, also offers ranking points.

Features

Prize money

This table shows minimum total prize money for each level of BWF World Tour tournament. The minimum total prize money is decreased due to the COVID-19 pandemic in 2021. All values are in United States dollar.

The prize money is distributed via the following formula:

World Tour Finals

Super 1000 and Super 750

Super 500, Super 300, and Super 100

World Ranking points

Entries

Each tournament will be held in six days, with the main round in five days.

Nationality separation

Player commitment regulations
Top fifteen singles players and top ten doubles pairs in the World Ranking will be required to play in all 4 Super 1000, all 6 Super 750, and 2 out of 8 Super 500 tournaments occurring in the full calendar year, making it a total of 12 mandatory tournaments. A fine of US$5000 per event will be imposed upon players/pairs who fail to play. Exemption from penalty will be considered by BWF on receipt of a valid medical certificate or strong evidence that prove players unfit to participate. However, suspended or retired are not subject to these regulations.

Umpires
Current regulations state that at least six umpires must be from member associations other than the host member association, at least four BWF and two continental certificated umpires with well spread nationality. All umpires and service judges shall meet the eligibility criteria set for the panel of Technical Officials they belong to.

Tournaments
Every four years, the BWF Council will review the countries that host a BWF World Tour tournament.

There is a BWF World Tour Finals, four Super 1000, six Super 750, seven Super 500, and eleven Super 300 tournaments in a season. BWF Tour Super 100 tournaments are still counted to earn the points to BWF World Tour Finals. Super 100 tournaments are selected in every year, 11 tournaments are selected in 2018. For 2019 onward, Scottish Open was relegated to International Challenge. For 2021, Dutch Open was relegated to International Challenge.

BWF World Tour Finals

At the end of the BWF World Tour circuit, top eight players/pairs in the BWF World Tour standing of each discipline, with the maximum of two players/pairs from the same member association, are required to play in a final tournament known as the BWF World Tour Finals. It offers minimum total prize money of US$1,500,000.

If two or more players are tie in ranking, the selection of players will based on the following criteria:
The players who participate in the most BWF World Tour tournaments;
The players who collect the most points in BWF World Tour tournaments starting from 1 July that year.

Performances by countries 
Tabulated below are the World Tour performances based on countries. Only countries who have won a title are listed:

World Tour Finals, Super 1000, Super 750, Super 500, and Super 300

Super 100

Title sponsor
 HSBC (2018–2026)

See also

References

External links

 
Badminton tours and series
Recurring sporting events established in 2018